Trostianets (also Trostyanets;) is a city in Okhtyrka Raion of Sumy Oblast of northeastern Ukraine. It was the administrative center of Trostianets Raion until it was abolished on 18 July 2020. The city lies on the Boromlya River,  from Sumy. Landmarks include a neo-Gothic "round courtyard" (1749), the late Baroque church of the Annunciation (1744–50), the 18th-century Galitzine palace, and a "grotto of nymphs" (an 1809 centenary memorial to the Battle of Poltava). The city has a population of 

Many were killed and the city was badly damaged during the 2022 Russian invasion of Ukraine.

History

Trostianets arose in the first half of the 17th century, during a new wave of migration of peasants and Cossacks from the Right-bank Ukraine to Sloboda Ukraine. The name of the city is associated with the name of the river Trostyanka, which flows nearby.

Until 1765, Trostianets was under the jurisdiction of the Okhtyrka Regiment, then - part of Sloboda Ukraine.  From 1835 Trostyanets was a part of Kharkov Governorate of the Russian Empire situated within the Akhtyrka Uyezd.

During 1864, the composer Pyotr Ilyich Tchaikovsky stayed at a villa in Trostianets when composing his overture The Storm.

From 1868 to 1874 the estate was owned by a St. Petersburg merchant.  In 1874, Trostianets was acquired by the great sugar producer Leopold Koenig.  The last owner of the estate until 1917 was his son Julius.

In 1877, by order of the Russian Minister of Railways, the Smorodyne locomotive depot was built in Trostianets and 12 steam locomotives were purchased.

A local newspaper began to be published in Trostianets in 1930, and in the city after 1940.

On 12 July 1940, Trostianets was granted administrative status as a city. During World War II, the city was occupied by Axis troops from October 1941 to August 1943. In January 1989 the population was 25,706 people.

2022 Russian invasion of Ukraine

During the Russian invasion of Ukraine, Trostianets — strategically located between the larger settlements of Sumy and Kharkiv — was attacked by Russian forces shortly after the invasion was launched on 24 February and was captured by them on 1 March 2022. On 4 March, 2022, an unfolding humanitarian catastrophe was reported by local authorities. Trostianets was liberated by the Ukrainian 93rd Mechanized Brigade on 26 March. The city suffered major damage to its infrastructure during the fighting and a Ukrainian official said that the retreating Russian troops had mined a local hospital. The villa Tchaikovsky had stayed in was among buildings destroyed by the Russian troops.

The regional prosecutor’s office in Sumy opened an investigation over evidence that Russian troops had thrown hand grenades at civilians protesting the Russian occupation of Trostianets on March 18.

After the city had been liberated, the British newspaper The Guardian found evidence of executions, torture and looting.

Nature and recreation

Trostyanets is located near the picturesque Neskuchnoye tract, where there are three lakes among a mixed pine-deciduous forest. The nearby arboretum almost merged with the forest. In 1995-1996, a sports recreation center was destroyed, located in a pine forest near one of the lakes.

There are several architectural monuments in the city - the "Round Yard" of 1749, the Golitsyn's manor house, churches, the nymphs' grotto of 1809 and others, which are gradually being repaired and restored. Recently, picturesque plein-airs “Picturesque Trostyanechchina” have been held in Trostyanets, as a result of which an exposition of paintings by artists from different countries was created in the former landowner's estate.

Industry
The most famous enterprise of Trostyanets is the chocolate factory "Ukraine", one of the leading enterprises in the industry. This enterprise belongs to the company "Mondelēz International" (formerly "Kraft Foods"), which is known for its trademarks "Crown", "Alpen Gold", "Jacobs", "Tuc", "Barny" and Milka.

Transport
The railway line Sumy–Liubotyn, stations Smorodino-Trostyanets and Rupino. The national road N12 passes through the town and connects Sumy and Poltava.

Sports
Trostianets is a football club based in the city, which made its debut in the Ukrainian Second League in the 2021–22 season. The team plays matches at the local Volodymyr Kuts Stadium, named after the Olympic champion Volodymyr Kuts (1927-1975), a native of Oleksyne, Trostianets Raion.

Famous people
 Mykola Khvylovy is a Ukrainian writer. The theorist of Ukrainian national communism and the author of the slogan "Get away from Moscow!"
 Leonid Tatarenko - Ukrainian writer.
 Victor Dobrovolsky - scientist in the field of general mechanical engineering, teacher, rector of Odesa National Polytechnic University.
 Vasily Podgorny, founder of the Podgornovtsy sect.

Gallery

References

External links 

  Unofficial city portal

Cities in Sumy Oblast
Akhtyrsky Uyezd
Cities of district significance in Ukraine
Populated places established in the 17th century